Lopphavet is a stretch of open sea along the border of Troms og Finnmark and Troms og Finnmark counties in Norway. The Sørøysundet strait and the Altafjorden connect to the Lopphavet on the east side of the sea. The Kvænangen fjord connects to the south. The Fugløysundet strait connects to it in the west.

References

Landforms of Troms og Finnmark
Straits of Norway
Loppa
Skjervøy
Kvænangen
Hasvik